Chora Chuvanna Chora is a 1980 Indian Malayalam film,  directed by G. Gopalakrishnan. The film stars Raghavan, G. K. Pillai, Jalaja and Kuthiravattam Pappu in the lead roles. The film has musical score by G. Devarajan.

Cast
Madhu Malini as Gouri 
G. K. Pillai
Jalaja as Sundari
Kuthiravattam Pappu as Danger
Santha Devi
Raghavan (actor) as Pushkaran
Santhakumari as Kamalakshiyamma
T. G. Ravi as Kumaran
KPAC Azeez as Keshavan
Mala Aravindan as Shiva naanu
Nellikodu Bhaskaran 
Jagannatha Varma as Gouri's father
Thrissur Elsy as House owner

Soundtrack
The music was composed by G. Devarajan and the lyrics were written by Mullanezhi and GK Pallath.

References

External links
 

1980 films
1980s Malayalam-language films